Elise O'Byrne-White (born 14 October 1990) is an Irish female rugby union player.  
She earned her first cap in 2016 against Wales in Donnybrook Stadium.

O'Byrne-White plays provincially for Leinster Rugby and plays her club rugby with Old Belvedere.

She competed in the Irish Sailing and Mountaineering Adventure Challenge.

She is a veterinary surgeon for the Dublin Society for Prevention of Cruelty to Animals. She appeared in the television series, "The Shelter: Animal SOS".

References

External links 

 Kathryn speaks with vet and professional rugby player Elise O’Byrne-White THE RAY D'ARCY SHOW, 7 April 2021

1990 births
Living people
Irish female rugby union players
Leinster Rugby players
Old Belvedere R.F.C. players
Place of birth missing (living people)